Goat throwing (in Spanish: Lanzamiento de cabra desde campanario or Salto de la cabra) was a festival in Manganeses de la Polvorosa, province of Zamora, Spain, celebrated on the fourth Sunday of January, where a group of young men threw a live goat from the top of a church. A crowd below would then catch the falling goat with a canvas sheet. The event is inspired by a legend that states that a goat, which miraculously fed the poor with its milk, fell out of the tower, but landed safely. 

Animal rights groups demanded the end of this festival several times, until the practice was banned in 2000. A toy plush goat was thrown in the 2014 celebration.

See also 

 Animal rights
 Cruelty to animals
 Pain in animals

References 

Animal festival or ritual
Animal rights
Animal welfare
Cruelty to animals
Festivals in Spain
Goats
Province of Zamora
Animals in entertainment